Nandowrie is a rural locality in the Central Highlands Region, Queensland, Australia.

Geography 
The Nogoa River forms the northern boundary of the locality. The Dawson Developmental Road passes through the locality from north-east (Cona Creek) to south-west (Mantuan Downs).

History 
The origin of the name Nandowrie may be the Nandowrie Lagoon on the road from Springsure to Tambo.

Tresswell State School opened on 25 January 1971 on the pastoral property "Tresswell". In March 1974, the school moved to a new building in its current location. It celebrated its 40th birthday in 2011.

Education 
Tresswell State School is a primary (P-6) school for boys and girls operated by the Queensland Government on the Dawson Developmental Road. It is a one-teacher school with students drawn from local cattle properties. In 2018, it had no students, the numbers having dwindled from 6 in 2015 and 4 in 2017. However, there were pre-school children in the district, likely to attend the school in future years, so the school was only temporarily closed. As at 2022, the school has no students and is officially "open" but "not currently operational".

There is no secondary schooling in the locality. Secondary schooling to Year 10 is available in Springsure; secondary schooling to Year 12 is available in Emerald.

References 

Central Highlands Region
Localities in Queensland